Television in Tamil language dates back to 1990s. The largest of which are Sun TV, Star Vijay, Raj TV, Jaya TV, Kalaignar TV and Zee Tamil. Most of the major television studios are located on Chennai in Tamil Nadu. As of 2022, there are more than 50 channels in the Tamil language. The television industries are by far the largest television industries after Hindi language in India.

Important genres of television shows include serials, news programs, variety shows, game shows, Movies and documentaries. Most Indian-Tamil television programs are available on satellite and multicultural channels in foreign countries (Sri Lanka, Malaysia, Singapore, Europe, the Middle East and Australia). The first private channel was Sun TV from India.

History

The first Tamil language small screen programming began in the early 1960s in Singapore and 1980s in India. It started off broadcasting from 7.15 pm to 11.15 pm every day, showing programmes in Singapore's four official languages (Tamil, Malay, Chines and English). Tamil programming was originally shown on Channel 8 from its launch on 23 November 1963 until 1 September 1995. In India was only one national channel, the government-owned Doordarshan. It started off broadcasting showing programmes in Indian's languages in 1980s.

The 2000s were the golden years for Tamil language's television industry. Growth was phenomenal in every dimension.

Television by Country

India

The first Tamil television channels Sun TV and DD Podhigai was launched on 14 April 1993 in India. Businessmen Kalanithi Maran established the first Tamil language TV station Sun TV which started broadcasting on 14 April 1993, with started off with a four and a half hour programming per day on a time sharing agreement with ATN. However, in January 1997 it became 24 hours programming channel. Sun TV Network recently launched a DTH service and its channels are now available in several countries outside India.

On 14 October 1994 Raj TV was launched by Rajendran. And became as the second most popular channel in Tamil in the early 2000s. The same year another channel called Golden Eagle Communication was launched by N. P. V. Ramasamy Udayar, which was later acquired by the Star India in 2001 took over the channel and rebranded it as Star Vijay.

On 22 August 1999 Jaya TV was launched as in respect of former Chief minister of Tamil Nadu J. Jayalalithaa.

The most recent channels and networks in the Tamil-based Indian broadcasting industry include Jaya TV, Kalaignar TV, Zee Tamil, Polimer TV, Colors Tamil, Vendhar TV, Makkal TV and Puthuyugam TV. Currently the major four cable general entertainment channels that dominate the TRP rivalry are Sun TV, Star Vijay, Zee Tamil, Kalaignar TV and Colors Tamil.

Singapore
Singapore Television Twelve split the former Channel 12 on 1 September 1995, with the existing channel being replaced by Prime 12, including Tamil-language programming on its schedule. The first Singapore Tamils channel Vasantham Central was launched 30 January 2000. It was founded and is owned by MediaCorp. On 19 October 2008 when Vasantham Central relaunched as Vasantham TV.

Malaysia
The first Tamil Malaysians channel was Astro Vaanavil. It was launched on 1 June 1996 and created by Astro. The second general entertainment channel was Astro Vinmeen HD. It was launched on 18 October 2013. The co-owned by Southeast Asia's second richest man, Ananda Krishnan and Astro Malaysia Holdings.

Sri Lanka
The Sri Lankan Tamils channel was in the early 2000s. On 20 October 1998, Shakthi TV was launched by Capital Maharaja.  And became as the first most popular channel in Sri Lanka.

France
The first France-based Tamil language satellite television channel Tamil Television Network was launch in June 1997. Its main audience were Sri Lankan Tamils living in Europe, the Middle East and Australia. It was first Tamil-language TV station outside India. The channel ceased broadcasting on 2 May 2007 when Globecast stopped relaying the channel.

Canada
The first Canadian-based Tamil language channel Tamil One was launch on 6 September 2001. Its main audience were Sri Lankan Tamils. The second entertainment channel was Tamil Vision International based in Toronto, Ontario. It was launched on 7 September 2001. It is the largest Tamil media outlet in North America.

The third entertainment channel was Tamil Entertainment Television officially launched on December 13, 2012, on Bell Fibe TV. It is the first 24 hours Tamil channel in North America to broadcast in HD.

United Kingdom
IBC Tamil Television was launched in April 2015 at a ceremonial event in London. It was second Tamil channel in United Kingdom after Deepam TV. The channel was launched with over 1500 people. Deepam TV was launched in June 2000. The channel broadcasts 24 hours a day from its studios in Hayes.

In 2015, the company announced that it invested £2 million in state-of-the-art digital studio equipment. The channel now produces nearly all its video content in HD through its studios in UK, India and Sri Lanka.

Australia
The The first Australian-Tamil based Television channel was Sigaram TV was launched in the early 2000s. In September 2006 due to Sigaram's bankruptcy. Tharisanam TV acquired the existing subscribers from Sigaram TV. In Europe for a short period of time during mid-2008 Tharisanam TV's name was changed to Thendral TV due change of management. However, in Australia, the channel continued to operate as Tharisanam TV.

In October 2008 the channel changed its name to Global Tamil Vision. Today Global Tamil Vision is one of the largest Tamil TV networks in the world.

Streaming Service (OTT)
Online video streaming, also known as Over-the-top (OTT) services like Hotstar, Sun NXT, ZEE5, Amazon Prime Video, Mediacorp, MX Player and others, gained popularity in Tamil People after 2020 COVID-19. It created a threat to the Tamil television industry.

Channels by Country

General Entertainment

See also
 List of Tamil-language television channels in India
 List of Tamil-language television channels
 Tamil television drama

References

 
Tamil-language Entertainment
Television